is a Japanese politician who was the 43rd governor of Kagawa Prefecture in Japan, serving three terms from 1998 until 2010. In 2009 he announced he would not contest the 2010 election and was succeeded by Keizō Hamada.

References 
 

University of Tokyo alumni
Politicians from Kagawa Prefecture
1940 births
Living people
Governors of Kagawa Prefecture